Vrutci is a village located in the city of Užice, southwestern Serbia. As of 2011 census, the village has a population of 138 inhabitants. Much of the settlement was flooded into Lake Vrutci for Užice's water supply.

Gallery

References

Užice
Populated places in Zlatibor District